"Do You Know the Way to San Jose" is a 1968 popular song written and composed for singer Dionne Warwick by Burt Bacharach. Hal David wrote the lyrics. The song was Warwick's biggest international hit to that point, selling several million copies worldwide and winning Warwick her first Grammy Award. David's lyrics tell the story of a native of San Jose, California, who, having failed to break into the entertainment field in Los Angeles, is set to return to her hometown.

The song was released on the 1968 RIAA Certified Gold album Dionne Warwick in Valley of the Dolls. "Do You Know the Way to San Jose" was issued as the follow-up single to the double-sided hit "(Theme from) Valley of the Dolls"/ "I Say a Little Prayer" in April 1968. It became Warwick's third consecutive top ten song in the closing months of 1967 and into 1968, punctuating the most successful period of her recording career.

The song peaked at No. 8 in the UK, Ireland, and Canada. It also charted highly in France, Italy, South Africa, Australia, Germany, Brazil, Mexico, Israel, Lebanon, Japan, and many other countries throughout the world. The single was one of the most successful of Warwick's international hits, selling over 3,500,000 copies worldwide. The flip-side of the single, "Let Me Be Lonely", also penned by Bacharach/David, charted in the Billboard Hot 100 as well and became one of many double-sided hits for Warwick.

Production
Bacharach had composed the music for the song before David wrote its lyrics. David had a special interest in San Jose, having been stationed there while in the Navy.

The track was the last Dionne Warwick single to be recorded at New York City's Bell Sound Studios. It features a prominent use of bass drum, played by session musician Gary Chester. The engineer was Ed Smith, who devised the famous introduction to the tune by directly attaching a microphone to the head of Chester's bass drum. The electric bass was played by studio musician Lou Mauro.

Warwick did not like "Do You Know the Way to San Jose", and she had to be convinced to record it. In a May 1983 interview with Ebony, she said: "It's a dumb song and I didn't want to sing it. But it was a hit, just like [her recent Top Ten hit] 'Heartbreaker' is. I'm happy these songs were successful, but that still doesn't change my opinion about them." Though she still does not like it, the song remains one of Warwick's most popular chart selections, and she still includes it in almost every concert she performs.

Awards
In 1969, Warwick won her first Grammy Award for Best Female Pop Vocal Performance, for "Do You Know the Way to San Jose". She told Jet in May 2002; "that winning this award was the overall highlight of her career".

Charts

Weekly charts

Year-end charts

Cover versions
 Frankie Goes to Hollywood in the album Welcome to the Pleasuredome (1984)
 Sandi Griffiths and Sally Flynn aka Sandi and Sally Duet this song twice, once in 1968 and in 1969 on the Lawrence Welk Show

References

External links
 

1967 songs
1968 singles
Dionne Warwick songs
Celia Cruz songs
Songs with lyrics by Hal David
Songs with music by Burt Bacharach
Scepter Records singles
Songs about Los Angeles
Songs about California
Songs about cities in the United States
Grammy Award for Best Female Pop Vocal Performance